The 57th Guards Motor Rifle Division was a division of the Soviet Ground Forces.

History

World War II 
It traces its history to the 57th Guards Rifle Division. The 57th Guards Rifle Division was formed from the 153rd Rifle Division (Second formation) on 31 December 1942. It was part of the 'operational army' from 31.12.1942 to 07.06.1944 and from 15.06.1944 to 09.05.1945. Its operations included:

Millerovo–Voroshilovgrad operation
Izyum–Barvenkovo Offensive
Donbass Offensive
Lower Dnepr offensive
Dnipropetrovsk offensive
Dnepr-Carpathian Offensive
Nikopol–Krivoi Rog Offensive
Bereznegovatoe-Snigirevskaya Offensive
Odessa offensive 
Operation Bagration
Lublin-Brest Offensive
Vistula-Oder Offensive
Warsaw-Poznan offensive
Seelow-Berlin operation
Berlin offensive

It fought on the Don River, in Ukraine, on the Vistula River, and in the Berlin Operation. With 8th Guards Army of the 1st Belorussian Front May 1945.

Cold War 
Became 57th Guards Motor Rifle Division on 17 May 1957 at Naumburg, still with 8th Guards Army. During the 1980s it consisted of the :
170th Guards Motor Rifle Regiment (Naumburg)
174th Guards Motor Rifle Regiment (Weißenfels)
241th Guards Motor Rifle Regiment (Leipzig)
57th Guards Tank Regiment (Zeitz)
128th Artillery Regiment (Zeitz)

The division withdrew from Germany in April 1993 and moved to Chelyabinsk, part of the Ural Military District. It was disbanded in June 1993.

Popular culture
The 57th Guards Motor Rifle Division is featured in the board game Red Storm Rising, based on Tom Clancy's book Red Storm Rising.

References

Further reading

External links
http://www.ww2.dk/new/army/msd/57gvmsd.htm

057
Military units and formations established in 1957
Military units and formations disestablished in 1993